was a village located in Kiso District, Nagano Prefecture, Japan.

As of 2003, the village had an estimated population of 1,930 and a density of 16.09 persons per km². The total area was 119.92 km².

On November 1, 2005, Mitake, along with the town of Kisofukushima, and the villages of Hiyoshi and Kaida (all from Kiso District), was merged to create the town of Kiso.

External links
 Kiso official website 

Dissolved municipalities of Nagano Prefecture
Kiso, Nagano (town)